The couple dance competition in artistic roller skating at the 2022 World Games took place from 16 to 17 July 2022 at the Birmingham Crossplex in Birmingham, United States.

Competition format
A total of 4 couples (4 men & 4 women) entered the competition. Short program and long program were held.

Results

References